James Aloysius O'Leary (April 23, 1889 – March 16, 1944) was an American lawyer and businessman who served five terms as a Democratic member of the United States House of Representatives from New York from 1935 to 1944.

Early life and career 
O'Leary was born in New Brighton, Staten Island. He attended St. Peter's Academy, Augustinian Academy, and Westerleigh Collegiate Institute, and also studied law.  He became active in the real estate and insurance businesses, and in 1917 he joined the North Shore Ice Company, of which he was general manager and vice president from 1920 to 1934.

Political career 
He unsuccessfully ran for a New York State Senate seat in 1930. He was elected to Congress in 1934 and served from January 3, 1935, until his death in 1944 in West New Brighton, Staten Island.

Family 
His great-grandson, Vito J. Fossella Jr., served as a Republican member of the United States House of Representatives representing New York's 13th congressional district from 1997 to 2009.

See also
 List of United States Congress members who died in office (1900–49)

Sources

1889 births
1944 deaths
People from Staten Island
Democratic Party members of the United States House of Representatives from New York (state)
20th-century American politicians